Malle Juhkam is a retired Estonian para athletics competitor, she competed in long jump.

At the 1996 Summer Paralympics in Atlanta, she won a bronze medal in the Women's long jump MH.

References

Living people
Year of birth missing (living people)
Paralympic athletes of Estonia
Place of birth missing (living people)
Estonian female long jumpers
Athletes (track and field) at the 1996 Summer Paralympics
Medalists at the 1996 Summer Paralympics
Paralympic bronze medalists for Estonia